Daniel Schuman is an American lawyer, technologist, author, and government transparency advocate. Demand Progress co-founded the website  EveryCRSReport, which publishes all reports authored by the Congressional Research Service.

Schuman has worked at the Sunlight Foundation, Citizens for Responsibility and Ethics in Washington, and Demand Progress. He runs the OpenGov Jobs listserv for transparency-focused positions, and was formerly a fellow with CodeX: the Stanford Center for Legal Informatics.

Schuman regularly testifies in front of the United States Congress as a transparency advocate.

References

External links 
 
 Schuman's articles on Slate.com
 Schuman's articles on JustSecurity
 Schuman's blogs on the Sunlight Foundation Blog

21st-century American lawyers
Living people
Year of birth missing (living people)
Emory University alumni
Emory University School of Law alumni